Eagles is a box set by the American rock band the Eagles. The box set includes material from the band's time under the Elektra and Asylum labels between 1972 and 1980.

Reception
Allmusic's Stephen Thomas Erlewine gave the album four and a half out of five stars and praised the set's artwork, but called it, "nice, but it's something that only hardcore fans will truly find a bargain at a list price of $129.98."

Track listing

Eagles
  "Take It Easy"  (Jackson Browne, Glenn Frey) – 3:32
  "Witchy Woman"  (Don Henley, Bernie Leadon) – 4:11
  "Chug All Night"  (Frey) – 3:16
  "Most of Us Are Sad"  (Frey) – 3:35
  "Nightingale"  (Browne) – 4:08
  "Train Leaves Here This Morning"  (Gene Clark, Leadon) – 4:10
  "Take the Devil"  (Meisner) – 4:01
  "Earlybird"  (Leadon, Meisner) – 3:00
  "Peaceful Easy Feeling"  (Jack Tempchin) – 4:17
  "Tryin'"  (Meisner) – 2:53

Desperado
  "Doolin-Dalton"  (Browne, Frey, Henley, J.D. Souther) – 3:29
  "Twenty–One"  (Leadon) – 2:10
  "Out of Control"  (Frey, Henley, Nixon) – 3:05
  "Tequila Sunrise"  (Frey, Henley) – 2:54
  "Desperado"  (Frey, Henley) – 3:36
  "Certain Kind of Fool"  (Meisner, Frey, Henley) – 3:02
  "Doolin-Dalton"  (Browne, Frey, Henley, Souther) – :47
  "Outlaw Man"  (David Blue) – 3:34
  "Saturday Night"  (Meisner, Frey, Henley, Leadon) – 3:20
  "Bitter Creek"  (Leadon) – 5:03
  "Doolin-Dalton/Desperado (Reprise)"  (Browne, Frey, Henley, Souther) – 4:50

On the Border
  "Already Gone"  (Strandlin, Tempchin) – 4:15
  "You Never Cry Like a Lover"  (Henley, Souther) – 4:00
  "Midnight Flyer"  (Craft) – 3:58
  "My Man"  (Leadon) – 3:30
  "On the Border"  (Frey, Leadon, Henley) – 4:23
  "James Dean"  (Browne, Frey, Henley, Souther) – 3:38
  "Ol '55"  (Waits) – 4:21
  "Is It True"  (Meisner) – 3:14
  "Good Day in Hell"  (Frey, Henley) – 4:26
  "The Best of My Love"  (Frey, Henley, Souther) – 4:34

One of These Nights
  "One of These Nights"  (Frey, Henley) – 4:51
  "Too Many Hands"  (Meisner, Felder) – 4:40
  "Hollywood Waltz"  (B.Leadon, T.Leadon, Frey, Henley) – 4:01
  "Journey of the Sorcerer"  (Leadon) – 6:38
  "Lyin' Eyes"  (Frey, Henley) – 6:21
  "Take It to the Limit"  (Meisner, Frey, Henley) – 4:46
  "Visions"  (Felder, Henley) – 3:58
  "After the Thrill Is Gone"  (Frey, Henley) – 3:56
  "I Wish You Peace"  (Davis, Leadon) – 3:45

Hotel California
  "Hotel California"  (Felder, Frey, Henley) – 6:30
  "New Kid in Town"  (Frey, Henley, Souther) – 5:03
  "Life in the Fast Lane"  (Frey, Henley, Walsh) – 4:46
  "Wasted Time"  (Frey, Henley) – 4:56
  "Wasted Time (Reprise)"  (Frey, Henley, Norman) – 1:23
  "Victim of Love"  (Felder, Frey, Henley, Souther) – 4:09
  "Pretty Maids All in a Row"  (Vitale, Walsh) – 3:58
  "Try and Love Again"  (Meisner) – 5:10
  "The Last Resort"  (Frey, Henley) – 7:28

The Long Run
  "The Long Run"  (Frey, Henley) – 3:43
  "I Can't Tell You Why" (Schmit, Frey, Henley) – 4:55
  "In the City"  (DeVorzon, Walsh) – 3:46
  "The Disco Strangler"  (Felder, Frey, Henley) – 2:44
  "King of Hollywood"  (Frey, Henley) – 6:28
  "Heartache Tonight"  (Frey, Henley, Bob Seger, Souther) – 4:26
  "Those Shoes"  (Felder, Frey, Henley) – 4:54
  "Teenage Jail"  (Frey, Henley, Souther) – 3:44
  "The Greeks Don't Want No Freaks"  (Frey, Henley) – 2:20
  "The Sad Café"  (Frey, Henley, Souther, Walsh) – 5:35

Eagles Live
  "Hotel California"  (Felder, Frey, Henley) – 7:00
  "Heartache Tonight"  (Frey, Henley, Seger, Souther) – 4:33
  "I Can't Tell You Why"  (Schmit, Frey, Henley) – 5:17
  "The Long Run"  (Frey, Henley) – 5:51
  "New Kid in Town"  (Frey, Henley, Souther) – 5:53
  "Life's Been Good"  (Walsh) – 8:56
  "Seven Bridges Road"  (Young) – 3:54
  "Wasted Time"  (Frey, Henley) – 5:21
  "Take It to the Limit"  (Meisner, Frey, Henley) – 5:14
  "Doolin-Dalton (Reprise II)"  (Frey, Henley, Norman) – :41
  "Desperado"  (Frey, Henley) – 3:57
  "Saturday Night"  (Meisner, Frey, Henley, Leadon) – 3:47
  "All Night Long"  (Walsh) – 5:34
  "Life in the Fast Lane"  (Frey, Henley, Walsh) – 5:09
  "Take It Easy"  (Browne, Frey) – 5:16

Bonus single
  "Please Come Home for Christmas"  (Charles Brown, Redd) – 3:00
  "Funky New Year"  (Frey, Henley) – 4:01

References

Eagles (band) compilation albums
2005 compilation albums
Albums produced by Glyn Johns
Albums produced by Bill Szymczyk
Warner Music Group compilation albums